Satan's Baby Doll is a 1983 Italian horror film directed by Mario Bianchi.

Plot
The daughter (Jacqueline Dupré) and brother of a dead aristocrat are placed in the care of an evil nun in a remote Spanish castle.  The daughter embarks on a rampage of lust and murder after becoming possessed by the spirit of her dead mother.

Cast
 Jaqueline Dupré as Miria Aguilar
 Mariangela Giordan as Sol
 Aldo Sanbrell as Antonio Aguilar
 Joe Davers as Isidro
 Giancarlo Del Duca as Dr. Juan Suarez
 Alfonso Gaita as Ignazio Aguilar
 Marina Hedmann as Maria Aguilar

Production
For Satan's Baby Doll, Gabriele Crisanti and screenwriter Piero Regnoli opted to remake the film Malabimba – The Malicious Whore, which included casting Mariangela Giordano to reprise her role. Giordano spoke negatively on the role, stating that remaking Malabimba was "a stupid move. I felt used, abused and exploited." It was the last film Giordano made with Crisanti, ending both their professional and personal relationships. Unlike Cristanti's earlier films, which were hybrids of sex and horror, the target for Satan's Baby Doll was for a hardcore pornography audience. This included casting Italy's best known pornographic actress of the period Marina Hedman and Alfonso Gaita, who was a regular in Italian hardcore pornography films of the period. Jacqueline Dupré was a stagename of an actress who Mario Bianchi stated he couldn't remember her real name, but recalled that she lived in Ostia and that this was seemingly her only film.

Filming began on August 17, 1981. Aldo Sambrell was involved in a unsimulated sex scene with Marina Hedman, which he later recalled: "We had to shoot a love scene, Marina and I... Well, I was lying on the bed, waiting for her, and when she showed up we started making out; after a while I realized that she was doing it for real and I had to stop her..." Sambrell contacted Crisanti to state he could not work under these conditions. Sambrell was replaced by Gaita for the explicit shots.

Release
Satan's Baby Doll was submitted to the Italian rating board in June 1982 in a softcore version which had a running time of a little over 73 minutes. The film was first released in Spain on 25 February 1983 in a softcore version titled La hija de Satanas. The Spanish version was seen by 20,230 spectators and grossed a 2019 equivalent of 30,200 Euro. It was distributed theatrically in Italy by Film 2 on 29 July 1983. Although Bianchi and Cristanti had denied a hardcore version of the film had existed, a hardcore version of the film premiered on a German DVD in 2007. The hardcore version runs at 88 minutes.

See also 
 List of Italian films of 1983

Footnotes

Sources

External links

1983 films
1980s pornographic films
1983 horror films
Italian erotic horror films
Pornographic horror films
Films about Satanism
Films directed by Mario Bianchi
Incest in film
Films set in Spain
1980s Italian films